Berrier is a hamlet in Cumbria, England. It is in the civil parish of Mungrisdale, which is made up of eight hamlets and had a population of 297 in the 2011 United Kingdom census. The civil parish of Berrier and Murrah existed from 1866 to 1934, Murrah being a nearby hamlet.

Etymology
'Berrier' means 'hill shieling' - from Old English (OE) 'berg', 'hill', and Old Norse (ON)'erg' 'shieling', 'hill pasture'.
'Murrah' is "a compound of OE 'mōr', 'marsh', and ON  '(v)rá', 'nook', 'corner'. "

See also

Listed buildings in Mungrisdale

References

External links

  Cumbria County History Trust: Berrier-and-Murrah (nb: provisional research only - see Talk page)

Hamlets in Cumbria
Mungrisdale
Former civil parishes in Cumbria